Zalipais bruniense is a species of microscopic sea snail, a marine gastropod mollusc in the family Skeneidae.

Description
The height of the shell attains 0.5 mm, its diameter 0.9 mm.

Distribution
This marine species is endemic to Australia, occurring off South Australia, Tasmania, Victoria and in the Bass Strait.

References

 Cotton, B.C. 1959. South Australian Mollusca. Archaeogastropoda. Handbook of the Flora and Fauna of South Australia. Adelaide : South Australian Government Printer 449 pp.

bruniense
Gastropods of Australia
Gastropods described in 1883